Sonos, Inc. is an American developer and manufacturer of audio products best known for its multi-room audio products. The company was founded in 2002 by John MacFarlane, Craig Shelburne, Tom Cullen, and Trung Mai. Patrick Spence has been its CEO since 2017.

Sonos has partnered with over 100 companies that offer music services, including Pandora, iHeartRadio, Spotify, MOG, QQ Music, and Amazon Music.  Sonos products work with the three major voice assistants: Amazon Alexa, Google Assistant, and Apple Siri, although the last is currently only supported through Apple's Home app. In 2019 Sonos acquired Snips SAS, a privacy-focused AI voice platform for connected devices with the goal to bring a music-specific assistant to its devices.

Product line

The company's product line consists mainly of powered speakers, amplifiers and peripherals. Current products include:
 Speakers: One,One SL, and Five
 The Era 100 will replace the Sonos One on March 28th, 2023
 The Era 300 will join the lineup on March 28th, 2023
 Portable speakers: Move, Roam, Roam SL
 Soundbars: Arc, Beam (Gen 2), Ray
 Subwoofer: Sub, Sub Mini
 Components: Amp, Port

In addition, through a partnership with IKEA, the following speakers are also part of the Sonos ecosystem:
 Bookshelf: SYMFONISK Bookshelf
 Lamps: SYMFONISK Table lamp
 Picture frames: SYMFONISK Picture frame

List of current and past products 
The following is a list of all of current and past Sonos and Sonos-ecosystem products:

Automotive 
Sonos currently makes car audio systems. The first automotive brand to partner with Sonos is Audi in the Audi Q4 e-tron.

Automobile brands that currently have Sonos audio systems available in their vehicles are Audi.

Selected product pictures

History

Corporate, financial, and marketing history 

Sonos was founded in August 2002 by John MacFarlane, Craig Shelburne, Tom Cullen and Trung Mai, with MacFarlane wanting to create a wireless service.

During 2004, MacFarlane brought prototypes of the first Sonos products to several industry events, including the June 2004 "D2: All Things Digital" conference in Carlsbad, California (where Steve Jobs told MacFarlane that the Sonos controller's scroll wheel might violate Apple patents related to the iPod,) and the December 2004 Digital Music Summit.

Sonos aimed to begin shipping its products in the fourth quarter of 2004 but missed that deadline.  The company first introduced its products to the market in January 2005 and first shipped them in either January or March 2005.

In May 2005, Sonos announced that its initial product line would go on sale in the United Kingdom in the following month.  The company has continued to broaden its international sales, for example to Japan in 2018.

In May 2012, Sonos opened the Sonos Studio in Los Angeles, a studio and art gallery in which art was exhibited along with Sonos' products for free, and featured events with artists like Beck, The Lonely Island and Solange, and released a video about its development.  The Los Angeles location was closed in 2018; a London location remains open.

In December 2013, the company was estimated to have raised $118 million in venture funding, including a $25 million round; its investors included Kohlberg Kravis Roberts, Redpoint Ventures and Elevation Partners.

In January 2015, Sonos was rebranded by Bruce Mau Design, with a new visual identity and improved logotype that was created over the span of four years, from 2011 to 2014.  There have been other brand refreshes, including one in 2019.

In February 2016 Sonos also released a study called Music Makes it Home Study.

In March 2016, CEO John MacFarlane announced the company's shift to streaming music services and voice control instead of local playback, and laid off some employees.

In July 2016, the company opened its first Sonos Store in SoHo.

In September 2016, the company announced that its products would become available at the Apple Store.

In January 2017, MacFarlane announced via the company's blog that he would be stepping down from his role as CEO, and that he would be succeeded in this position by former COO Patrick Spence.

In December 2017, IKEA and Sonos announced a collaboration to build Sonos' technology into furniture sold by IKEA.

In August 2018, Sonos went public, trading on the NASDAQ under the symbol SONO.

In November 2019, Sonos acquires Snips SAS, a privacy-focused AI voice platform for connected devices with the goal to bring a music-specific assistant to its devices.

In April 2020, Sonos revealed a new "sonic logo" composed by Philip Glass, featuring an ensemble of 21 musicians. The logo will be heard in the listening experience of Sonos Radio, an Internet radio streaming service that was unveiled by the company the same month.

In June 2020, Sonos announced plans to lay off 12% of its workforce, close its New York store and six of its offices, and cut its top executives' pay by 20% for three to six months, in response to the economic disruptions caused by the COVID pandemic.

In November 2020, Sonos launched “Sonos Radio HD", a paid ad-free tier of Sonos Radio.

In January 2022, Sonos won the lawsuit against Google and Google had to remove certain features such as group volume controller from its devices.

Product history 

Products announced by Sonos (excluding several smaller or less-important ones) have been:

 June 2004 - Sonos announced its first products—the Digital Music System consisting of two components, the ZonePlayer and the Controller (later renamed as the ZP100 and CR100, respectively) -- then expected to be available in fall 2004.  The products were introduced at the January 2005 Consumer Electronics Show.  They first shipped either on January 27, 2005, or March 2005.
 January 2006 - the unamplified ZonePlayer ZP80, with analog and digital input and output connections to link a user's Sonos system to their traditional amplifier.
 August 2008 - the ZonePlayer120 (ZP120, later CONNECT:AMP), replacing the ZP100, and the ZonePlayer90 (ZP90, later CONNECT), replacing the ZP80.
 October 2008 - a free Controller app for the iPhone and iPod Touch, reducing the need for Sonos' separate controllers.  Controller apps were later released for other IOS devices and for Android.
 July 2009 - the CR200, a second handheld controller to replace the CR100, with a touch screen rather than the CR100's scroll wheel.  Sales of the CR200 were discontinued in 2012. Existing CR200 controllers continue to operate, however there are reports of touchscreen failures which cannot be repaired. 
 November 2009 - the ZonePlayer S5 (later PLAY:5), the first independent Sonos-connected amplified speaker.
 July 2011 - the Play:3, a second, smaller, amplified speaker in its Play lineup of smart speakers.
 May 2012 - the SUB wireless subwoofer.
 February 2013 - the PLAYBAR soundbar speaker.  
 October 2013 - the Play:1, a third, compact, smart speaker. 
 February 2015 - Sonos announced the limited edition Blue Note Play:1, a collaboration with Blue Note Records, which went on sale in March.  There have been other similar Sonos releases, available for limited times, such as a Beastie Boys PLAY:5 and a series of Sonos Ones in five new colors developed by the Danish design firm HAY.
 September 2015 - A new ("2nd gen") Play:5 speaker was announced, and pre-orders began in October. 
 March 2017 - the PLAYBASE, a soundbase to go under a television.  
 October 2017 - the Sonos One, a small connected speaker with voice control.  A key feature of whole house systems starting in 2017 was the adoption of Amazon's Alexa as a third-party voice controller. 
 April 2018 - production of the Play:3 was discontinued, effective July 31.
 June 2018 - the Sonos Beam, a soundbar with voice control, was announced.  
 August 2018 - An updated version of the Sonos Amp was unveiled, with a planned limited release in December.
 March 2019 - A second-generation Sonos One, with Bluetooth LE connectivity, a faster processor, and more memory.
 August 2019 - The first two products resulting from the IKEA-Sonos collaboration, called SYMFONISK, a small bookshelf speaker and a combination table-lamp/speaker, became available from IKEA.
 September 2019 - The introduction of the first battery operated Sonos speaker called Move. The speaker is portable and has the rating of IP56 making it humidity, heat, and cold resistant. It uses an indoor charging base and claims to play up to 10 hours on a full charge.  Sonos also announced the One SL, a version of its One without voice control, replacing the Play:1, and the Port, an updated version of the Connect, to add Sonos functionality into an existing, wired stereo system.
 March 2021 - The introduction of the smallest battery operated Sonos speaker called Roam. The speaker is a smaller version of the Move carrying over the features such as portable, IP56 rated and durable. In the box is just the Roam and a USB charging cable and claims to play up to 10 hours on a full charge.  There is a charging bases available similar to the Move, but sold separately.
 September 2022 - Sonos launched the Sub Mini wireless subwoofer. The Sub Mini is cylindrical and is available in matte black or white, it can be paired with AirPlay-enabled Sonos speakers.

History of outside services supported 
In April 2005, Sonos announced that its products could play music from Rhapsody, the first of many music services that its products would support.  Starting in September 2006 Sonos supported Rhapsody from its own Controller without use of a PC. Subsequently, added services include:

 Sirius XM (February 2011) 
 MOG (May 2011)
 Spotify (July 2011)
 QQ Music, with collaboration from Tencent (May 2012) 
 Amazon Cloud Player (August 2012)
 Amazon Music (October 2015)
 Apple Music (February 2016)

Sonos devices support the Amazon Alexa and Google Assistant virtual assistants. Apple Siri is only supported through Apple's Home app.

Logo history 

The word is a palindrome and the logo a rotational ambigram.

Technical details

Communication between Sonos products 
Multiple Sonos devices in a single household are connected to each other wirelessly, through a wired Ethernet network, or a mixture of the two. The Sonos system creates a proprietary AES-encrypted peer-to-peer mesh network, known as SonosNet.  This allows for each unit to play any chosen input and if desired share it as synchronized audio with one or more other chosen zones. The first versions of SonosNet required a single ZonePlayer or ZoneBridge to be wired to a network for access to LAN and Internet audio sources or when creating a 3.1/5.1 surround setup.  SonosNet 2.0 integrated MIMO on 802.11n hardware, providing a more robust connection. Later, the company added support for connecting to an existing Wi-Fi network for internet connectivity, removing the wired network requirement.

S1 and S2 operating systems 
In 2020, Sonos released its S2 operating system. Its existing system was renamed "S1" to differentiate it from its new system. All products launched after May 2020 support S2 exclusively.

Trueplay 
In November 2015, a tuning feature called Trueplay was released in a software update.  Trueplay tunes the output of Sonos smart speaker units to the acoustics of the room they are in. The initial tuning process requires the use of a suitable Apple smartphone or tablet.

Standby and Low power mode 
Sonos devices generally do not have power buttons, and the company claims that each speaker consumes 4–8W in idle/standby. Its battery-powered lineup does have power buttons to turn them on and off.

Reception 
In November 2004, the Sonos Digital Music System won the "Best of Audio" award at the 2005 CES Innovations Design and Engineering awards.

A February 2005 Macworld review of the first Sonos system explained its background, components and operation.

Support for the CR100 ended in 2018 when Sonos sent out an update that intentionally caused the CR100 to cease to function, resulting in expressions of unhappiness from a number of long-time Sonos customers.   Sonos later settled a class action lawsuit related to its decision to intentionally cause the CR100 to cease to function.

Sonos was criticized by media outlets in December 2019 for its "Recycle Mode", which bricks devices that users register into the company's trade-in program. Customers who participate in the program receive a 30 percent discount on a purchase of a new Sonos device, but the registration puts the device into Recycle Mode, which starts a timer that turns the device permanently non-functional in 21 days. An electronic waste recycler criticized the procedure on Twitter for being environmentally unfriendly, stating that it discourages reuse by preventing recyclers from reselling functional Sonos units. Sonos responded that Recycle Mode was intended to ensure that prospective customers purchase newer Sonos models instead of older secondhand models. In March 2020, Sonos discontinued the Recycle Mode and no longer requires customers to dispose of products submitted for its trade-in program.

On January 22, 2020, Sonos notified the end of support for speakers made before 2015, meaning that they eventually will lose functionality, something that sparked anger from their owners. Many of these speakers were purchased by customers after 2015, meaning that customers paid full price for equipment that will cease to be supported after two or three years.  On January 23, 2020, following a widespread backlash and criticism of this announcement, Sonos reversed and clarified it, stating that it would continue to support its older equipment.

Locations

Headquarters 
The headquarters are located in Santa Barbara, California.

Stores 
The first official Sonos Store was opened in New York City on July 12, 2016. It was closed in June 2020. A store opened on Seven Dials in London, in November 2017. A store opened in Berlin in April 2018.

Offices 
There are currently 12 offices operated by Sonos independently. These are located in Australia, China, Denmark, France, Germany, Netherlands, United States, Sweden and the United Kingdom. An engineering office was present in Boston, US as of 2017.

Explanatory notes

References

External links 

 

 
2002 establishments in California
2018 initial public offerings
American companies established in 2002
Audio equipment manufacturers of the United States
Companies based in Santa Barbara, California
Companies listed on the Nasdaq
Consumer electronics brands
Electronics companies established in 2002
Kohlberg Kravis Roberts companies
Loudspeaker manufacturers
Manufacturing companies based in California